Cosimo Izzo (5 May 1943 – 26 December 2022) was an Italian lawyer and politician. A member of Forza Italia and The People of Freedom, he served in the Senate of the Republic from 2001 to 2013.

Izzo died in Naples on 26 December 2022, at the age of 79.

References

1943 births
2022 deaths
Christian Democracy (Italy) politicians
Forza Italia politicians
The People of Freedom politicians
Senators of Legislature XIV of Italy
Senators of Legislature XV of Italy
Senators of Legislature XVI of Italy
University of Naples Federico II alumni
Italian lawyers
Politicians from Naples